Xiayuan station is a metro station of Guangzhou Metro Line 13 in Guangzhou's Huangpu District, and will serve as an interchange station with Line 5.

History
In 2013, the provincial development committee approved plans for Line 13 Phase I, but, a hotel in the vicinity receiving insufficient monetary compensation, construction did not commence until 15 April 2015, along with the rest of the stations in Line 13 Phase I. Eight days after the beginning of construction, sewage work at Xiayuan station damaged a coal gas pipeline, leading to leakage.

Station layout

Exits

References

External links

Guangzhou Metro stations in Huangpu District
Railway stations in China opened in 2017